Badjelly the Witch is a brief handwritten, illustrated story by Spike Milligan, created for his children, then printed in 1973. It was made into an audio and a video version.

In 1975, in the planning for an audio version for the BBC "infant's programme" Let's Join In, Milligan objected to the planned removal of God from the story. The BBC wrote in a letter that the object was not to put God on the same level as goblins, to which Milligan replied that goblins, fairies and God all exist. However, he allowed God to be removed.

In 1974 Ed Welch set Badjelly the Witch to music and the LP was released on Polydor Records. Milligan narrated it with a large orchestra, and the LP was a reasonable success. In New Zealand, where it was regularly played on morning radio, it was a huge success and has sold over 40000 recordings up to 2012.

Synopsis 
In the story, two children Tim and Rose, looking for their lost cow Lucy, meet magical enchanted forest characters. They are captured by Badjelly the witch, then rescued by an eagle. God intervenes as they escape, and the witch is destroyed when she attempts to "scratch God's eye out". The characters enchanted by Badjelly are rescued.

Film

In 2000, CBBC and Ragdoll Productions had collaborated on a film based on the book and aired on Christmas Day. Spike Milligan, the book's writer, narrated the movie. Milligan also wrote and starred as himself. The characters in the film were all voiced by Spike, while Tim & Rose were voiced by child actors Sarah Wichall and Jake Dudley.

Theatre

Alannah O'Sullivan's 1977 adaptation of Badjelly the Witch is the most licensed New Zealand Play. It was first professionally produced by Company Theatre, Tauranga and has had over 100 productions throughout New Zealand. Playmarket published the script in their New Zealand Theatrescripts series edited by David Carnegie.

In 2010, 2016, and 2018 Tim Bray Productions presented its version of 'Badjelly the Witch' on stage at The PumpHouse Theatre, Takapuna, Auckland, New Zealand. Tim Bray adapted and directed the book into a stage play and included The Goons' 'Ying Tong' song along with Monty Pythonesque comedy. The script is available through Playmarket, New Zealand's script agency. Both seasons were hugely successful.

In 2010/11, there was a production created by the Chickenshed Theatre Company called Badjelly's Bad Christmas, with Badjelly the Witch, along with many other characters created by Milligan such as Sir Nobonk and King Twytt, as the main characters.

The show was performed for a season during 2006 for the New Theatre, Sydney. The show was directed by Rosane McNamara, and featured actors Vanessa Caswill, Jodine Muir, David Walker and Richie Black.

In 2009, Waihi College performed the show.

References

See also

Sir Nobonk and the Terrible Dreadful Awful Naughty Nasty Dragon, a similar novel also written by Spike Milligan

1973 children's books
2000 animated films
2000 films
British children's novels
British children's animated films
DHX Media films
Animated films based on children's books
Novels by Spike Milligan
British novels adapted into films
British children's books
British novels adapted into plays
Michael Joseph books
2000s English-language films
2000s British films